Owens Pottery of North Carolina, also known as Original Owens Pottery is the oldest, continuously-operating pottery in North Carolina. It sells a variety of traditional, functional clay products and is best known for its difficult-to-produce fire red glazed pottery. Owens Pottery is currently owned and operated by Boyd Owens.

History
Owens Pottery was founded in 1895 by James H. Owens, who was born in 1866, son of Franklin Owen. The Owens family has been involved in pottery since the early 1800s.

See also
 Seagrove, North Carolina
 Pottery Highway

References

American pottery
Industrial buildings completed in 1895
Buildings and structures in Moore County, North Carolina
National Register of Historic Places in Moore County, North Carolina
1895 establishments in North Carolina